Lujali (also Romanized as Lūjalī, Loojli, Lowjallī, Lūjallī, and Lūjlī; also known as Lojanlī and Lūjānlī) is a city in Sarhad District, Shirvan County, North Khorasan Province, Iran. Residents of this city are Kurds. At the 2006 census, its population was 701, in 174 families.

References 

Populated places in Shirvan County
Cities in North Khorasan Province